José Alberto Martínez Trinidad (born September 10, 1975, in Urdiain, Navarre) is a Spanish former professional road cyclist.

Career achievements

Major results

1999
 2nd Overall Euskal Bizikleta
 3rd Overall Grand Prix du Midi Libre
1st Stage 1
2000
 1st Stage 1 Vuelta a Burgos
 2nd Overall G.P. Portugal Telecom
 3rd Overall Volta a la Comunitat Valenciana
 3rd Overall Vuelta a Murcia
2001
 2nd Overall Critérium International
 2nd Overall Tour of the Basque Country
2002
 1st Overall Critérium International
2005
 1st Classic Loire Atlantique
2006
 1st Overall Bayern-Rundfahrt
 1st Stage 3 Critérium International

Grand Tour general classification results timeline

External links

Spanish male cyclists
Cyclists from Navarre
1975 births
Living people
People from Barranca (comarca)